Mount Terry Fox Provincial Park is a provincial park in British Columbia, Canada. It is located in the Rocky Mountains near Mount Robson and the city of Valemount, British Columbia. The park and Mount Terry Fox, which is within the park, are named in honor of amputee long-distance runner and cancer research activist Terry Fox, a native of Winnipeg, Manitoba who grew up in British Columbia.

External links

BC Parks entry

Terry Fox
Regional District of Fraser-Fort George
Provincial parks of British Columbia
Robson Valley
1982 establishments in British Columbia
Protected areas established in 1982